Belltown may refer to:
 Belltown, Stamford, a neighbourhood in Stamford, Connecticut, United States
 Belltown, Douala, a neighbourhood in Douala, Cameroon
 Belltown, Ottawa, a neighbourhood in Ottawa, Canada
 Belltown, California, United States
 Belltown, Delaware, United States
 Belltown, Illinois, United States
 Belltown, Tennessee, an unincorporated rural community in Cheatham County, Tennessee, United States
 Belltown, Seattle, a neighborhood in Seattle, Washington, United States
 Belltown Media, Inc., a former publisher of the Linux Journal